The women's team archery competition at the 2010 Asian Games in Guangzhou was held from 19 November to 21 November at Aoti Archery Range.

Schedule
All times are China Standard Time (UTC+08:00)

Results

Qualification round

Knockout round

References

 2010 Asian Games Archery Results Book

External links 
 

Women's team